was a light aircraft carrier of the Imperial Japanese Navy during World War II. Originally constructed as the second vessel of the  seaplane tenders in 1934, she continued to operate in that capacity during the Second Sino-Japanese War and the early stages of the Pacific War until her conversion into a light aircraft carrier after the Battle of Midway. She was sunk during the Battle of Leyte Gulf by a combination of naval bombers, cruiser shellfire and destroyer-launched torpedoes.

Background
The Chitose-class seaplane tenders were procured by the Imperial Japanese Navy under the 2nd Naval Armaments Supplement Programme of 1934 as purpose-built ships, whereas their predecessors were all conversions of merchant or auxiliary ship designs. During the 1930s, the Imperial Japanese Navy made increasing use of naval aviation as scouts for its cruiser and destroyer squadrons. Due to restrictions imposed by the Washington Naval Treaty and London Naval Treaty, the number of aircraft carriers was strictly regulated; however, there was no limitation as to seaplane tenders.

Design
Chiyoda was designed from the start on the premise that the design from the waterline upwards could be modified to suit a variety of missions.
As designed, Chiyoda carried a complement of Kawanishi E7K Type 94 "Alf" and Nakajima E8N Type 95 "Dave" floatplanes. Her armament consisted of four 12.7 cm/40 Type 89 naval guns and twelve Type 96 25 mm AA guns.

Propulsion was of four boilers, which operated two geared steam turbines providing  and two propellers. With two additional diesel engines operating Chiyoda could attain .

With the loss of four large aircraft carriers at the Battle of Midway, the Imperial Japanese Navy rushed a project to convert the Chitose-class into light aircraft carriers as partial compensation. A wooden  flight deck was installed, with two elevators. The bridge was moved to the front end of the new hangar deck, and the boiler exhaust gases was discharged through pipes to the starboard side below the flight deck, and the diesel engines had smaller, separate smokestacks also on the starboard side. As converted, the ship could carry 30 aircraft.

Operational history

As a seaplane tender
Chiyoda was laid down on 14 December 1936 and launched on 19 November 1937 at Kure Naval Arsenal and was commissioned on 15 December 1938. On completion, she was assigned directly to the Combined Fleet under the command of Captain Tomeo Kaku and was dispatched to the front lines in the Second Sino-Japanese War paired with the seaplane tender . She remained engaged in combat operations in China until May 1940.
On returning to Kure Naval Arsenal on 23 May 1940, Chiyoda underwent her first major modification, with her aircraft capacity reduced from 24 to 12 aircraft, and the space used to store 12 Type A Kō-hyōteki-class submarines. This rebuild was completed on 23 June, and Chiyoda was assigned to the 4th Fleet based at Truk in September. Captain Kaku Harada was appointed captain in August. Chiyoda returned to participate in a naval review held on 11 October in Yokohama to celebrate the 2600th anniversary of the founding of the Japanese Empire. Afterwards, she was reassigned back to the Combined Fleet and began training operations on the use of her midget submarines through September, developing tactics for attacking other vessels (using Chitose as a target) and penetrating enemy naval bases. At the time of the attack on Pearl Harbor, Chiyoda was docked at Kure and continued training operations to 20 March 1942, when she was assigned to Vice Admiral Teruhisa Komatsu’s 6th Fleet together with the submarine tender  and Aikoku Maru.

During the Battle of Midway, Chiyoda was part of Main Body of the Japanese fleet. For this operation, she carried eight Type A Kō-hyōteki-class submarines, which were intended to be stationed at Kure Atoll, which was to be seized as a seaplane base for operations against Midway Atoll. The operation was cancelled on the loss of the Japanese aircraft carriers during the Battle of Midway, and Chiyoda returned to Hashirajima with her submarines on 14 June without having seen combat.

During June, Chiyoda was refit for operations in northern waters, and departed Yokosuka Naval District on 28 June, arriving at Japanese-occupied Kiska in the Aleutian islands on 5 July with a construction team to build a seaplane base. She was attacked by aircraft from the United States Army Air Force 11th Air Force on the same day, without damage and arrived back at Hashirajima on 19 July.

On 25 September, Chiyoda was reassigned to the Guadalcanal area in the Solomon Islands and delivered eight Type A Kō-hyōteki-class submarines to Shortland Island on 14 October. She was attacked by Allied aircraft on 29 October and 31 October, but suffered no damage, and on 6 November, after her return to Truk, she was attacked by the submarine , which fired three torpedoes at Chiyoda, all of which missed. Chiyoda returned to Yokosuka on 8 January 1943 and was converted from a seaplane tender to a light aircraft carrier at the Yokosuka Naval Arsenal beginning 16 January, with the work completed on 21 December 1943.

Conversion
After conversion, Chiyoda was assigned to the 3rd Fleet and departed Yokosuka for Saipan, Guam and Palau, Balikpapan and Davao on 1 March as part of emergency reinforcements following the fall of Kwajalein to the US, returning to Kure on 10 April. On 11 May, she departed for Tawitawi with Air Group 653 as part of Operation A-Go, for the defense of the Mariana Islands. She was accompanied by the carriers Chitose,   and by the battleship . She was hit by a bomb on 20 June on her aft flight deck, which killed 20 crewmen, wounded 30 more and destroyed two aircraft. She was withdrawn for repairs on 22 June. She remained at Kure through the end of July.

Final battle

On 20 October 1944 Chiyoda departed Oita as part of Admiral Jisaburō Ozawa’s Decoy Force intended to lure the American fleet away from the landing beaches in the Philippines in the Battle of Leyte Gulf. Ozawa's ostensible carrier group was facing a force that included ten United States Navy carriers containing 600–1,000 aircraft. On 25 October, both Chiyoda and Chitose were sunk by a combination of naval bombers, cruiser shellfire and destroyer-launched torpedoes during the Battle off Cape Engaño.

Chiyoda was crippled by four bombs dropped by aircraft from the carriers  and  that left her dead in the water. The converted hybrid battleship-carrier Hyūga attempted to take her in tow, but was prevented by a third attack. The cruiser  was ordered to remove Chiyodas crew, but this was also frustrated due to continuing danger from air and surface attack. After three attempts, Isuzu was forced to retreat with U.S. surface forces in sight and Chiyoda under naval gunfire. No survivors were permitted to be rescued, and Captain Jō Eiichirō and the entire crew of 1,470 officers and men went down with the ship at position . Chiyoda was removed from the navy list on 20 December 1944.

Notes

References

Chitose-class aircraft carriers
Ships built by Kure Naval Arsenal
1936 ships
World War II aircraft carriers of Japan
World War II shipwrecks in the Philippine Sea
Seaplane tenders of the Imperial Japanese Navy
Ships of the Aleutian Islands campaign
Maritime incidents in October 1944
Ships lost with all hands